Rivière Blanche is a river in Haiti in Artibonite of the Dessalines Arrondissement.

Geography
This river is a tributary of the Artibonite River. It runs along the city of Deslandes when she joined her confluence with the Artibonite River.

References

Rivers of Haiti